The Venture Bros.: The Music of JG Thirlwell is a soundtrack album by J. G. Thirlwell, released on April 7, 2009 by Williams Street. It comprises music that Thirlwell composed for the animated television series The Venture Bros. The CD features 20 tracks, while the vinyl LP release is 16 tracks and a download link of the complete release including the songs omitted from the LP.

Track listing

Personnel 
Adapted from The Venture Bros.: The Music of JG Thirlwell liner notes.
 J. G. Thirlwell – instruments, musical arrangement, record producer, recording, mixing, photography, design

Musicians
 Steven Bernstein – trumpet (1, 9, 10)
 Paul Bonomo – keyboards (18)
 Jeff Davidson – piano (9), banjo (9), trumpet (16)
 Christian Gibbs – guitar (10)
 Paul Shapiro – flute (2, 5)

Production and additional personnel
  Fred Kevorkian – mastering

Release history

References

External links
 
 The Venture Bros. at foetus.org

2009 soundtrack albums
JG Thirlwell albums
The Venture Bros.
Williams Street Records albums
Albums produced by JG Thirlwell